The C. B. Bird House is a Tudor Revival house built in 1922 and located in Wausau, Wisconsin. It was added to the National Register of Historic Places on May 1, 1980.

Description and history
The house was designed by Alexander C. Eschweiler, and originally belonged to Claire B. Bird. Bird, a prominent attorney, once argued a case in front of the Supreme Court of the United States. He was also president of the Wisconsin Bar Association from 1913 to 1914 and became a member of the Wisconsin State Senate from 1918 to 1923.

References

Houses in Marathon County, Wisconsin
Houses on the National Register of Historic Places in Wisconsin
National Register of Historic Places in Marathon County, Wisconsin
Houses completed in 1922
Tudor Revival architecture in Wisconsin